Creighton Manning Engineering, LLP  is a multi-discipline civil engineering and surveying firm located in Albany, New York. The firm has been in business since 1965.

Creighton Manning Engineering claims to be one of the top 10 civil engineering firms in the Capital District. Creighton Manning Engineering was recently recognized as "One of the Great Places to Work in the Capital Region" through an independent survey conducted for the Business Review.

As of 2012, Creighton Manning has approximately 55 employees.  Employees are of the following positions: project manager, civil engineer, surveyor, construction inspector and CAD drafters.  Many of the firms engineers are professionally licensed as Professional Engineer.

Notable projects
Highway Engineering

Luther Forest Technology Campus: Creighton Manning is the lead civil engineering consultant for the local Economic Development Corporation. Creighton Manning was responsible for the highway design and construction inspection of the site.    The site is being prepared for construction of a chip fab plant by AMD.
Slingerlands Bypass (New York State Route 85): Creighton Manning was the lead civil engineering consultant for the NYSDOT responsible for the design of the bypass, along with four roundabouts in order to ease traffic congestion in the area.
NY Route 5 bus rapid transit: Creighton Manning is the lead civil engineering consultant on the Bus Rapid Transit (BRT) project for CDTA. In early 2008, the CDTA announced that it was going forward with the Bus Rapid Transit line on Route 5, which will include twenty upgraded stations.  CME assisted with the transportation planning study that identified Route 5 as a possible candidate for BRT service.  As of 2008, CDTA carries nearly 15 million passengers per year, with 20% on the Route 5 corridor.
Centennial Circle, a five way roundabout in Glens Falls, NY. Creighton Manning inspected the construction of the roundabout, which was completed in 2007 at a cost of $9 million.
Site Engineering 

Schenectady (Amtrak station): Creighton Manning is a partner in a current study to upgrade the Schenectady Train Station.
High Sheldon Wind Farm: Creighton Manning was responsible for the design of both the off-site intersection improvements and proposed access road improvements.

See also

 Civil engineer
 Infrastructure
 Highway engineering
 Structural engineering
 Construction surveying
Associations 
 American Society of Civil Engineers
 Institute of Transportation Engineers

Footnotes

References

External links
 Creighton Manning Engineering

Construction and civil engineering companies of the United States
Engineering consulting firms of the United States
Engineering companies of the United States
Companies based in Albany, New York
American companies established in 1965
Construction and civil engineering companies established in 1965
Privately held companies based in New York (state)